Umeå East Station (Swedish: Umeå Östra) is a railway station in Umeå, Sweden. The station was opened on 7 August 2010, with King Carl XVI Gustaf officially opening the station on 28 August. It was built in connection with the construction of the Bothnia Line (Botniabanan) to Umeå.

It is one of the two stations serving Umeå, the other being the older Umeå Central Station which is located 2 km to the west. For a year after its opening, East Station was the sole station serving Umeå as Central Station was closed during this time for renovation.  East Station is located close to the Umeå University and the University Hospital of Umeå.

The Building
The blueprint of Umeå East Station was proposed by Lennart Sjögren of White arkitekter with NCC AB financing the project. The building itself is mainly consisted of glass and glued laminated timber, and has two floors, with a Café located on floor 2. The accessibility of the station has been heavily prioritised and there are several elevator, escalators and stairs connecting the two subsequent floors. Furthermore, as the glass is non-reflective, trains are visible from almost every corner.

Services 
Umeå East is the second of two stops in Umeå for up to four daily intercity trains to and from Stockholm Central Station, operated by SJ AB Bombardier Regina X55 trains. SJ also operate a daily night train, with portions to Stockholm and Gothenburg which separate/join in Sundsvall.

In December 2020, Vy Tåg assumed operation of the Swedish Transport Administration state-supported night trains between Stockholm and Norrland, for a period of four years. Two Vy night trains call at Umeå East and Umeå Central in each direction every day: one between Narvik, Kiruna and Stockholm and one between Luleå and Stockholm.

Norrtåg provide local and regional rail services south towards Sundsvall, west towards Vännäs (until 2010, the original railway junction between Umeå and the Main Line Through Upper Norrland), north west towards Lycksele and north towards Boden, Luleå and Haparanda.

Photo gallery

References

Railway stations in Umeå
Railway stations opened in 2010
Bothnia Line
Buildings and structures in Umeå